Carl Eugen Guthe ( June 1, 1893 – July 24, 1974) was an American academic and anthropologist, son of Karl Eugen Guthe, Professor of Physics and Dean of the Graduate Department of the University of Michigan, and Clara Belle née Ware of Grand Rapids, Mich.  Guthe married Grace Ethel (née McDonald) 12 September 1916 in Wayne, MI and they had three sons: Karl Frederick, Alfred Kidder, and James.  Karl Frederick Guthe (1919–1994) was professor emeritus of biological sciences at the University of Michigan.  Alfred Kidder Guthe (1920–1983) specialised in the archaeology of the US eastern seaboard, and became director of the Frank H. McClung museum at U Tennessee.

Guthe graduated from the University of Michigan in 1914. He went on to receive two degrees in anthropology from Harvard University – an M.A. in 1915 and a Ph.D. in 1917. Guthe assisted Alfred Kidder with his excavations at Pecos, New Mexico: their efforts to ship the skeletons found there to the Peabody Museum at Harvard resulted in their being suspected of espionage. He became the first anthropologist hired at the University of Michigan, the first chair of anthropology there, and the first director of the school's new Museum of Anthropology in 1928. He also headed an archaeological expedition to the Philippines, which was used to supply exhibits to the museum. He left the university in 1944 to take up the appointment as director of the New York State Museum. He created the Society for American Archaeology and began publishing the American Antiquity journal.

Guthe Collection

Carl Guthe went to several locations in the Philippines to look for archaeological evidence. There are 485 sites represented in the total collection, 120 caves, 134 burial grounds and 231 graves. These artifacts are on display at the University of Michigan - Museum of Anthropology.

Bibliography of Carl Guthe

See also

https://anthrosource.onlinelibrary.wiley.com/doi/abs/10.1525/aa.1927.29.1.02a00040

https://aadl.org/node/393849

References

External links
 

1893 births
1974 deaths
University of Michigan alumni
Harvard Graduate School of Arts and Sciences alumni
University of Michigan faculty
20th-century American anthropologists